The Czechoslovakia women's national ice hockey team was the women's national ice hockey team of Czechoslovakia. The team was succeeded by the national women's teams of the Czech Republic and Slovakia following the split of Czechoslovakia in 1992.

History
Czechoslovakia played its first game in 1988 in an exhibition game against Switzerland, held in Beroun, Czechoslovakia, which they lost 8–1. The following year Czechoslovakia competed in a two-game qualification event against France in order to participate in the 1989 Women's European Ice Hockey Championships. Czechoslovakia defeated France 5–2 on aggregate, winning a spot in Group B for the 1989 tournament. During the group stage of the European Championships lost all three of their games, including a loss of 31–0 to Finland, which was recorded as Czechoslovakia's worst ever defeat. After finishing last in their group the team was drawn against Switzerland in a placement game for positions five to eight, with the other game being played between Denmark and the Netherlands. After losing to Switzerland, Czechoslovakia played the Netherlands for seventh place who had lost their game against Denmark. Czechoslovakia won the game 7–1 taking seventh in the rankings.

In 1991 Czechoslovakia fielded a team at the 1991 Women's European Ice Hockey Championships where they were placed in Group B. After losing three of their group stage games and tying in the fourth against Great Britain, Czechoslovakia was drawn in a placement game against France for seventh place. France won the game 2–1, taking seventh place in the rankings.

In 1992 the country of Czechoslovakia was split into the Czech Republic and Slovakia and so the Czechoslovakian women's national team was disbanded and succeeded by the Czech and Slovak women's national ice hockey teams.

International competitions
1989 Women's European Ice Hockey Championships. Finish: 7th
1991 Women's European Ice Hockey Championships. Finish: 8th

See also
Czechoslovakia men's national ice hockey team

References

 
Former national ice hockey teams
Ice hockey
Women's national ice hockey teams in Europe